Casnovia Township is a civil township of Muskegon County in the U.S. state of Michigan.  The population was 2,652 at the 2000 census.

Communities
The village of Casnovia lies partially within the township on M-46 and M-37 at the eastern edge of the township.
The ZIP code is 49303. Nearly all of northern Casnovia Township (which includes Bailey) is part of the Grant Public School District. A post office was established here in 1872.

Geography

Demographics
As of the census of 2000, there were 2,652 people, 881 households, and 702 families residing in the township. The racial makeup of the township was 94.34% White, 0.38% Native American, 0.11% Asian, 3.39% from other races, and 1.77% from two or more races. Hispanic or Latino of any race were 5.58% of the population.

There were 881 households, out of which 40.9% had children under the age of 18 living with them, 68.8% were married couples living together, 5.7% had a female householder with no husband present, and 20.3% were non-families. 15.4% of all households were made up of individuals, and 6.4% had someone living alone who was 65 years of age or older.  The average household size was 2.97 and the average family size was 3.32.

In the township the population was spread out, with 30.8% under the age of 18, 8.4% from 18 to 24, 31.2% from 25 to 44, 21.6% from 45 to 64, and 8.0% who were 65 years of age or older.  The median age was 33 years. For every 100 females, there were 106.2 males.  For every 100 females age 18 and over, there were 106.4 males.

The median income for a household in the township was $41,711, and the median income for a family was $46,875. Males had a median income of $37,458 versus $26,029 for females. The per capita income for the township was $16,880.  About 7.0% of families and 7.9% of the population were below the poverty line, including 10.1% of those under age 18 and 11.7% of those age 65 or over.

References

Notes

Sources

Townships in Muskegon County, Michigan
Townships in Michigan